Shipping investments are a form of alternative investment into an asset related to worldwide shipping. This could be into ships themselves, or a related asset such as containers, with the expectation of capital appreciation, dividends, and/or interest earnings.

Characteristics 

Some of the characteristics of shipping investments may include:
 Low correlation with traditional financial investments such as stocks and bonds
 Considered to be a relatively liquid investment as there is a second-hand market for shipping assets
 Considered to be a cyclical industry, with long supply and demand cycles since ships are large physical assets that take time to build, transport and dispose of
 Costs of purchase and sale may be moderately high
 There may be limited risk and return data

Ship ownership
Investment in ships involves purchasing or leasing new or second-hand vessels and either operating them directly or chartering them to other operators. Investors seek either profits generated from shipping fees, capital appreciation of the vessels themselves, or both. Due to the high capital commitments involved, ship investment has tended to be limited to ultra high net worth individuals and syndicates.

In the UK, investments in cargo ships can qualify for the Enterprise Investment Scheme, making it possible for individual investors to access ship ownership as an asset class.

Shipping container investments
Investment in shipping containers involves purchasing a container and having an external company manage and lease the containers to merchants. Investors are often promised high rates of return based on purportedly growing demand from cargo ships preferring to lease containers instead of buying them.

The industry is known to have been targeted by scams, particularly in the form of Ponzi schemes.

References

Investment